Diocese of Ragusa may refer to:

 Roman Catholic Diocese of Dubrovnik, Croatia, erected 990
 Roman Catholic Diocese of Ragusa, Sicily, erected 1950